The 1989 Football Cup of Ukrainian SSR among KFK  was the annual season of Ukraine's football knockout competition for amateur football teams.

Competition schedule

First qualification round

|}
Notes:

Second qualification round

|}
Notes:

Quarterfinals (1/4)

|}

Semifinals (1/2)

|}

Final

|}

See also
 1989 KFK competitions (Ukraine)

External links
 (1989 - 52 чемпионат СССР Кубок Украинской ССР среди КФК) at footbook.ru

Ukrainian Amateur Cup
Ukrainian Amateur Cup
Amateur Cup